The Changjiangbu–Jingmen railway is a railway line that connects the Jiaozuo–Liuzhou railway at Jingmen with the Hankou–Danjiangkou railway at Xiaxindian.

Construction on the line began in November 1998. Passenger service was introduced in 2005. Electrification of the line was completed in 2012.

The Jianghan Plain railway splits from the line to the east of Tianmen railway station.

References

Railway lines in China